Kinney County is a county located in the U.S. state of Texas. As of the 2020 census, its population was 3,129. Its county seat is Brackettville. The county was created in 1850 and later organized in 1874. It is named for Henry Lawrence Kinney, an early settler.

Kinney County's self-proclaimed biggest issue since the 2010s is undocumented immigration from Mexico through the county. The county claims it does not have the resources to deal with the large number of migrants, and in 2021 proclaimed a state of emergency.

History

Native Americans

The first inhabitants were 6,000–10,000 years ago and later came to include Lipan Apache, Mescalero Apache, Coahuiltecan, Jumanos, Tamaulipans, Tonkawa, and Comanches. These tribes settled in rock shelters in the river and creek valleys, leaving  behind artifacts and caches of seeds, implements, burial sites, and petroglyphs.

Early explorations

Saltillo Alcalde Fernando de Azcué  passed through the southeast corner of the county in 1665 on an expedition, becoming the first European to cross the Rio Grande. Franciscan Brother Manuel de la Cruz explored the county in 1674. In 1675, Fernando del Bosque traversed the area on an expedition up the Rio Grande from the city of Nuestra Sra. de Guadalupe. He was accompanied by Franciscan friars Juan Larios and Dionisio de San Buenaventura. Alonso De León in 1688 discovered French explorer and La Salle expedition deserter Jean Henri in a somewhat confused state of mind, among the Coahuiltecan Indians near the site of present Brackettville, generally believed to be at Anacacho Mountain. During the late 18th century, several Franciscans established a settlement on Las Moras Creek near the center of the county.  In 1834, while the area was still under Mexican control, English land speculators John Charles Beales and James Grant attempted to establish an English-speaking colony called Dolores at the site. Streets were laid off and 59 colonists were brought in, but the project was abandoned.

County established

The state legislature formed Kinney County from Bexar County in 1850, five years after Texas statehood, and named it for Henry Lawrence Kinney. The United States Army established Fort Clark in June 1852 on Las Moras Creek, and named it after John B. Clark, who had died in the Mexican War. Brackettville was founded in 1852 originally as the town of Brackett and named for Oscar B. Brackett, who came to set up a stage stop and opened the town's first dry-goods store. Brackett became a stop on a stage line from San Antonio to El Paso, but the settlement grew very slowly because of continuous Indian attacks. The town received its first post office in 1875. On February 18, 1861, on orders from United States Army General David E. Twiggs, Fort Clark was surrendered to the Texas Commission. Twiggs was dismissed by the United States for the act, and subsequently joined the Confederacy. The fort was evacuated by federal troops on March 19 and occupied by Confederate troops under the command of Confederate Colonel John R. Baylor. It remained in the hands of the Confederates until the end of the war, but was not garrisoned. In December 1866, it was reestablished as a federal fort.

Black Seminoles

In early 1872, a number of Black Seminoles living along the border were organized into a company of scouts and brought to Fort Clark. Others joined them, and by the mid-1870s, they numbered some 400 to 500. For the next quarter century, they lived on a reservation along Las Moras Creek. In 1914, the Black Seminoles were removed from the Fort Clark reservation, but some of their descendants still live in the county. The Seminole Indian Scouts cemetery was founded on Fort Clark in 1872.

County organization and growth

The county was organized in 1874.  County government followed in 1875. In 1876, Brackettville was designated county seat after the final boundaries of the county were set by the legislature. In 1870, the county had 14,846 cattle, and large numbers of cattle were driven north during the great drives of the mid-1870s. By 1880, sheep outnumbered cattle 55,597 to 7,966, and Kinney County became an important source of wool. The construction of the Galveston, Harrisburg and San Antonio Railway (later part of the Southern Pacific Railroad, and today part of the Union Pacific Railroad) through Spofford in 1883 gave the wool and mohair industry access to markets. At the same time, it also helped to bring in numerous new settlers. In 1925, a branch line of the Texas and New Orleans Railroad was built from near Spofford to connect with the Mexican National Railroad at the Rio Grande. A large Civilian Conservation Corps camp constructed adjacent to Fort Clark helped to employ some people during the Great Depression. With the onset of World War II, wool and mohair were in demand for the defense industries. Fort Clark was closed in 1946.

James T. “Happy” Shahan constructed Alamo Village on his ranch near Brackettville during the late 1950s, for filming of the 1960 John Wayne epic The Alamo. Preserved as a tourist attraction, Alamo Village continued to serve as a set for hundreds of movies and documentaries.  In 1969, Happy Shahan hired 18-year-old Johnny Rodriguez to sing at Alamo Village, an opportunity that rocketed Rodriguez to stardom.  Kickapoo Cavern State Park,  in both Edwards and Kinney Counties, opened to the public in 1991. It was formerly a private ranch. The Kinney County Groundwater Conservation District was approved by the voters in 2002.

Undocumented migrants

Kinney County's southwest border is for  the Rio Grande and the border of Mexico. It is on the route for undocumented border crossers heading for San Antonio, the closest city. According to the Kinney County official Web page, "Our county is being bombarded by hundreds of illegal aliens on a daily basis. Our local law enforcement is overwhelmed with illegal alien smuggling activity". In April 2021, Kinney County Sheriff Brad Coe, County Judge Tully Shahan, and Kinney County Attorney Brent Smith jointly issued a declaration of a state of disaster in the county. The State of Texas, under Governor Greg Abbott, has been moving state police and the Texas State Guard into Kinney and adjacent Val Verde County. As they cannot enforce federal immigration laws, they arrest migrants for trespassing on private property (ranches).

Geography
The county is separated from Mexico by the Rio Grande, and drained by numerous small tributaries of that river.

Major highways
  U.S. Highway 90
  U.S. Highway 277
  State Highway 131

Adjacent counties and municipios
 Edwards County (north)
 Uvalde County (east)
 Maverick County (south)
 Val Verde County (west)
 Jiménez, Coahuila, Mexico (south)

Demographics

As of the 2020 United States census,  3,129 people, 1,475 households, and 782 families were residing in the county.

As of the census of 2000, 3,379 people, 1,314 households, and 940 families resided in the county. The population density was 2 people per square mile (1/km2). The 1,907 housing units averaged 2 per square mile (1/km2). The racial makeup of the county was 75.8% White, 1.7% African American, 0.3% Native American, 0.1% Asian, 18.6% from other races, and 3.4% from two or more races. About 50.5% of the population was Hispanic or Latino of any race.

Of the 1,314 households, 27.2% had children under 18 living with them, 61.8% were married couples living together, 6.4% had a female householder with no husband present, and 28.4% were not families. About 26.6% of all households were made up of individuals, and 16.4% had someone living alone who was 65  or older. The average household size was 2.55, and the average family size was 3.10.

In the county, the age distribution was 25.7% under 18, 5.3% from 18 to 24, 21.5% from 25 to 44, 23.1% from 45 to 64, and 24.3% who were 65 or older. The median age was 43 years. For every 100 females, there were 99.8 males. For every 100 females 18 and over, there were 99.0 males.

The median income for a household in the county was $28,320, and for a family was $32,045. Males had a median income of $26,422 versus $16,250 for females. The per capita income for the county was $15,350. About 19.2% of families and 24.0% of the population were below the poverty line, including 33.0% of those under 18 and 16.1% of those 65 or over.

Communities
 Brackettville (county seat)
 Fort Clark Springs
 Spofford

Politics

Education
All of Kinney County is in the Brackett Independent School District.

The designated community college is Southwest Texas Junior College.

See also

 Brooks County, Texas
 List of museums in South Texas
 Missing in Brooks County
 National Register of Historic Places listings in Kinney County, Texas
 Recorded Texas Historic Landmarks in Kinney County

Notes

References

External links
 Kinney County government's website
 
 Kinney County Public Library
 Kinney County Profile from the Texas Association of Counties

 
1874 establishments in Texas
Populated places established in 1874